In Records was a record label started in 1964 and distributed by Vee-Jay Records.

See also
 List of record labels

Defunct record labels of the United States
Record labels established in 1964